Shama may refer to:

 Shama (film), a 1946 Bollywood film
Shama (magazine), an Urdu language film and literary magazine published from 1939-1999
 Shama (TV series), a 2011 Television Show 
 Shama District, Ghana
 Shama, Ghana, capital of the district
 Shama (Ghana parliament constituency)
 Shama language, a Kainji language of Nigeria
 Shema Yisrael, daily prayer in Judaism
 another name for Draupadi, wife of Pandavas
 the proper name of star HD 99109
 Shamas or Magpie-robins, of the genera Copsychus and Trichixos
 Shama or Samatva, a Hindu philosophy term meaning to have equal consideration or reserved judgement

See also
 Shamas (disambiguation)
 Shamma, a traditional garment worn by men in the highlands of Ethiopia